The southern cricket frog or southeastern cricket frog (Acris gryllus) is a small hylid frog native to the Southeastern United States. It is very similar in appearance and habits to the northern cricket frog, Acris crepitans, and was considered formerly conspecific (Dickerson 1906). The scientific name Acris is from the Greek word for locust, and the species name gryllus is Latin for cricket (Georgia Wildlife).

Description 
At 0.75–1.5 inches (16–32 mm) in length, Acris gryllus is even smaller than A. crepitans. Other characters that differentiate the southern species are: 
More pointed snout--A. crepitans more blunt.
Hind leg is more than half length of the body when folded—that of A. crepitans is less than one half body length. When rear leg is extended forward, the heel of A. gryllus usually reaches beyond the snout—does not reach snout in A. crepitans.
A. gryllus can jump longer distances than A. crepitans.
A. gryllus has a sharply-defined black stripe on the back of the thigh--A. crepitans has a ragged stripe.
Webbing on rear feet of A. gryllus is sparse, more extensive in A. crepitans.

Range and habitat 
The southern cricket frog is characteristic of coastal plain bogs, bottomland swamps, ponds, and ditches. It prefers sunny areas, and is usually not found in woodlands. Subspecies Acris gryllus gryllus is found in the Atlantic Coastal Plain from southeastern Virginia through the Carolinas, Georgia, Alabama, and Mississippi, west to the Mississippi River. It is found mostly east of the Fall Line, but extends into more upland areas of the Piedmont along river valleys. Subspecies Acris gryllus dorsalis is found throughout the Florida peninsula.

Habits 
The southern cricket frog feeds on insects, spiders, and other arthropods. It is active throughout the year in warm weather.

Reproduction 

Breeding is in late spring and summer. The advertisement call of the males is a loud rapid gick, gick, gick. Up to 150 eggs are laid at a time, and more than one mass may be produced in a season (Martof et al. 1980).

Subspecies 
 Acris gryllus dorsalis (Harlan, 1827) – Florida cricket frog
 Acris gryllus gryllus (LeConte, 1825) – Coastal plain cricket frog, southern cricket frog

References 

 Conant, Roger, et al. (1998). A Field Guide to Reptiles and Amphibians of Eastern and Central North America. Boston: Houghton Mifflin. .
 Dickerson, Mary C. (1906). The Frog Book. New York: Doubleday, Page, and Company.
 Georgia Museum of Natural History. Georgia Wildlife—accessed 15 May 2006
 Martof, Bernard S., et al. (1980). Amphibians and Reptiles of the Carolinas and Virginia. Chapel Hill: University of North Carolina Press. .
 Myers, P., et al. The Animal Diversity Web—accessed 15 May 2006
 United States Department of Agriculture, Integrated Taxonomic Information System (ITIS)—accessed 15 May 2006
 United States Geological Survey (USGS), Southeast Ecological Science Center—accessed 15 May 2006

External links

Acris
Amphibians of the United States
Endemic fauna of the United States
Fauna of the Southeastern United States
Articles containing video clips
Amphibians described in 1825